Ad. Oecusse or Associação Desportiva Oecusse is a football club of East Timor from Oecusse. The team plays in the Taça Digicel.

References

Football clubs in East Timor
Football
Association football clubs established in 2010
2010 establishments in East Timor
Oecusse